Florian Radu (8 April 1920 – 10 November 1991) was a Romanian footballer who played for hometown club Rapid București. When the Communists took over Romania, Radu moved abroad in Italy and France playing for AS Roma, Cosenza, Marsala and few other teams until his retirement in 1956.

Radu has earned only one cap for Romania on 11 October 1942 in a 2–2 draw against Croatia scoring on his debut.

He served as head coach for Stade Athletique Spinalien in France.

Honours

Player

Club
Rapid Bucharest
Cupa României (3): 1939–40, 1940–41, 1941–42

References

External links
 

1920 births
1991 deaths
Footballers from Bucharest
Romanian footballers
Romania international footballers
FC Rapid București players
A.S. Roma players
Cosenza Calcio 1914 players
Romanian expatriate football managers
Romanian expatriate footballers
Expatriate footballers in Italy
Serie A players
Nemzeti Bajnokság I players
Association football midfielders
SAS Épinal managers